Levash is a rural locality (a settlement) in Vostrovskoye Rural Settlement, Nyuksensky District, Vologda Oblast, Russia. The population was 375 as of 2002. There are 11 streets.

Geography 
Levash is located 60 km northeast of Nyuksenitsa (the district's administrative centre) by road. Zabolotye is the nearest rural locality.

References 

Rural localities in Nyuksensky District